Eric B. Rosendahl (born 1952 or 1953) is a Canadian politician who was elected in the 2015 Alberta general election to the Legislative Assembly of Alberta representing the electoral district of West Yellowhead. He has been President of the Yellowhead Labour Council. He was also the NDP candidate for the federal Yellowhead riding during the 2014 by-election.

Electoral history

2015 Alberta general election

2014 federal by-election

References

Alberta New Democratic Party MLAs
Living people
1950s births
21st-century Canadian politicians
People from Turtleford